is a block breaker game released for WiiWare on September 28, 2009.

Gameplay 
Arkanoid Plus! features similar gameplay to the original Arkanoid. The player controls the spaceship "VAUS", from which a ball at the beginning of each round, and the player must then move the ship left and right to hit the ball and keep it in play as it bounces up, down and all around the screen smashing through and ricocheting off of the bricks it touches. The goal is for the player to keep the ball in play long enough for it to smash all the bricks which will complete the level and allow the player to progress to the next one.

Reception 

According to review aggregator Metacritic, Arkanoid Plus! holds an average score of 71/100, indicating "mixed or average reviews".

References

External links 
 

2009 video games
Breakout clones
Multiplayer and single-player video games
Multiplayer hotseat games
Nintendo Wi-Fi Connection games
Video games developed in Japan
Wii games
WiiWare games